Vanavana, Kurataki, or Huataki is an atoll in the southeastern area of the Tuamotu Archipelago, French Polynesia.

Vanavana is a small oval-shaped atoll. There is one hook-shaped large island in the north and another in the south of its reef.

Vanavana Atoll is uninhabited; however, buildings on the northern end of the island are present.

History
The first recorded European to arrive at Vanavana was British mariner Captain Frederick Beechey in 1826. He named this atoll "Barrow Island", after Sir John Barrow.

Administration
Administratively Vanavana Atoll belongs to the commune of Tureia, which includes the atolls of Tureia, Fangataufa, Moruroa, Tematangi and Vanavana.

References

External links
Atoll list (in French)

Atolls of the Tuamotus